The Players Tour Championship 2011/2012 – Event 1 was a professional minor-ranking snooker tournament that took place between 18 and 22 June 2011 at the World Snooker Academy in Sheffield, England.

Ronnie O'Sullivan won his first title carrying ranking points since the 2009 Shanghai Masters 21 months earlier by defeating Joe Perry 4–0 in the final.

Prize fund and ranking points
The breakdown of prize money and ranking points of the event is shown below: 

1 Only professional players can earn ranking points.

Main draw

Preliminary rounds

Round 1
Best of 7 frames

Round 2
Best of 7 frames

Main rounds

Top half

Section 1

Section 2

Section 3

Section 4

Bottom half

Section 5

Section 6

Section 7

Section 8

Finals

Century breaks
Only from last 128 onwards. 

 145  Kurt Maflin
 138  Passakorn Suwannawat
 132, 124, 120, 115, 108, 107, 104, 101  Ronnie O'Sullivan
 132, 104  Dechawat Poomjaeng
 128  Graeme Dott
 127, 106  Xiao Guodong
 125  Dominic Dale
 124  Gareth Green
 122  Alfie Burden
 120, 113, 111, 110  Joe Perry
 120, 104  Simon Bedford
 119  Mark Selby
 117, 106, 103  Michael Holt
 117  Stephen Maguire
 116  Stephen Lee
 115  Stuart Bingham

 115  Ken Doherty
 112  Mark Joyce
 108, 105  Jack Lisowski
 108  Marcus Campbell
 107  David Gilbert
 106  Cao Yupeng
 105  Joe Jogia
 105  Eden Sharav
 104  Andy Hicks
 104  Tom Ford
 103  David Morris
 102  Kyren Wilson
 102  Martin Gould
 101, 101  Jamie Jones
 100  Bjorn Haneveer
 100  Robert Milkins

References

01
2011 in English sport
June 2011 sports events in the United Kingdom